August Chandron (b. August, 15 1866, d. March 28, 1947) was a United States Navy sailor and a recipient of the United States military's highest decoration, the Medal of Honor.

Biography
Born in France, Chandron immigrated to the United States and joined the Navy from New York at age 16. On that morning, while Quinnebaug was at Alexandria, Egypt, he and another sailor, Boatswain's Mate Hugh Miller, jumped overboard and rescued Ordinary Seaman William Evans from drowning. For this action, both Chandron and Miller were awarded the Medal of Honor. He was discharged on his 21st birthday in August 1887. 

Chandron's official Medal of Honor citation reads:
On board the U.S.S. Quinnebaug, Alexandria, Egypt, on the morning of 21 November 1885. Jumping overboard from that vessel, Chandron, with the aid of Hugh Miller, boatswain's mate, rescued William Evans, ordinary seaman, from drowning.

See also

 List of Medal of Honor recipients in non-combat incidents

References

External links
 
 

1866 births
1947 deaths
French emigrants to the United States
United States Navy sailors
United States Navy Medal of Honor recipients
French-born Medal of Honor recipients
Non-combat recipients of the Medal of Honor